DXKD (1053 AM) Radyo Ronda is a radio station owned and operated by Radio Philippines Network. The station studios are located at the 2nd floor of Sagario Building, National Highway, Turno, Dipolog. It is the pioneer AM radio station in the province. The station also airs a handful of programs from DWIZ 882 Manila. It operates daily from 6:00 AM to 9:00 PM.

Incidents and controversies
In 2012, DXKD station manager and news anchor Leo Cimafranca was reprimanded by the Dipolog City Council for accusing then-Mayor Evelyn Uy and her allies of terrorism in relation to the upcoming 2013 local elections.

References

Radio Philippines Network
RPN News and Public Affairs
News and talk radio stations in the Philippines
Radio stations established in 1968
Radio stations in Zamboanga del Norte